Josh Aloiai (born 11 November 1995) is a Samoan international rugby league footballer who plays as a  for the Manly-Warringah Sea Eagles in the NRL. 

He previously played for the Wests Tigers in the National Rugby League.

Background
Aloiai was born in Auckland, New Zealand. He is of Samoan and Italian descent.

He played his junior rugby league for the Glenora Bears, before being signed by the Parramatta Eels. His father, a national jiu-jitsu champion in New Zealand, died in 2009. Later relocating to Sydney Australia aged 17, he moved in with his aunt and uncle who, he said, "took me in as if I was their own".

Playing career

Early career
In 2014 and 2015, Aloiai played for the Parramatta Eels' NYC team. On 18 October 2014, he played for the Junior Kiwis against the Junior Kangaroos. His 2015 season was hampered by injury. He said, "I was running and as I was getting tackled my hip subluxed and it the process fractured my posterior wall of my hip." On 11 November, he signed a one-year contract with the Wests Tigers starting in 2016.

2016
Despite missing the pre-season with his hip injury, Aloiai made his NRL debut in round 1 against the New Zealand Warriors, playing off the interchange bench in the Tigers' 34–26 win at Campbelltown Stadium. He re-signed with the club for a further season soon after.

Playing as a reserve in the early weeks of the season, Aloiai progressed to the starting team from round 11 onward. He was the first Wests Tigers player to appear in every game of their rookie season. He said, "This year has definitely exceeded my expectations. I just feel really thankful and blessed how the year's gone."

2017
Suffering a broken jaw three weeks into the pre-season during a training session at the beach, Aloiai was hospitalised for a short time.  He said, "I just copped a bit of a shot in the jaw and got a few breaks. I had surgery that week. After the Christmas break I should be practically be into everything." He signed an extension to the end of 2019 in January, saying, "It's a privilege to be able to live my dream – the players that we have here have pretty much become my brothers and we also have quality staff at the club." In round 11, Aloiai suffered a "gruesome" dislocated patella that kept him off the paddock until the last 4 games. He scored 2 tries from his 15 appearances.

Aloiai was named in the Italian team for the 2017 Rugby League World Cup. but withdrew from the team.

2018
Aloiai played 16 games for the Wests Tigers, mostly from the bench, and made his first appearances in the front row.

In June, he made his international debut for Samoa against Tonga. He said, "When I told my Mum she got pretty emotional, just telling me how proud my father would have been. My aunties and uncles, my dad's brothers and sisters have all messaged me along with my first cousins just saying how proud it is for the Samoan side of the family."

At season's end, Aloiai was nominated for the Ken Stephen Medal for community service. He said, "It caught me by surprise actually. A lot of the community stuff I do, whether it is through the club or in my own time, I don't do it for recognition. My achievements say a lot about my mum."

2019
Starting the season on the bench, Alioai was moved to lock in round 5, before finishing as starting prop from round 17. Having made 17 appearances, his season ended after round 20 due to injury. Having been effected by a wrist complaint all season, he later said, "I broke my scaphoid, got a screw in it, but the screw broke off and moved into my wrist so I had to get some other surgeries. I ended up getting a rib graft done, where they grab some rib and some cartilage and use it to reconstruct your scaphoid and your wrist.  it had been about 18 months since I had a functional wrist."

2020
In a season shortened by Covid 19, Aloiai played 17 games, missing only two. For the first time in his career, he started at prop in every appearance. Scoring a personal best 3 tries, his stats were much improved on previous seasons. His running metres increased from an average of 94 per game in 2019 to 136 in 2020, and his tackles made and tackles missed were both the best of his career.

On 17 November, Aloiai handed in a transfer request to the Wests Tigers stating that he wanted an immediate release to join Manly-Warringah.  Wests Tigers chairman Lee Hagipantelis spoke to Fox Sports about the players transfer request stating "As far as we’re concerned he can mow the lawns at Leichhardt and Campbelltown and paint the sheds at Concord, He’s a contracted employee at the Wests Tigers for 2021 and under the terms of his employment he’ll be remaining at the club".

2021

In round 1 of the 2021 NRL season, he made his debut for Manly-Warringah in the club's 46–4 loss against Sydney Roosters.

On 4 May, Aloiai was ruled out for three months with a wrist injury.
In round 24, he was sent to the sin bin during Manly's 36–16 victory over wooden spooners Canterbury.
Aloiai played 16 games for Manly in the 2021 NRL season including the club's preliminary final loss against South Sydney.

Aloiai was set to make his professional boxing debut against Paul Gallen on 10 December but on 24 November it was revealed that Aloiai became the first NRL player to test positive to Covid-19 which meant his match needed to be postponed.

2022
In round 14 of the 2022 NRL season, Aloiai scored two tries against his former club the Wests Tigers in Manly's 30–4 victory.
Aloiai was one of seven players involved in the Manly pride jersey player boycott.

Aloiai played a total of 15 games in 2022 scoring four tries as Manly finished 11th on the table and missed the finals.

In October Aloiai was named in the Samoa squad for the 2021 Rugby League World Cup.

Personal life
Aloiai is a devout Christian. "I think the sport they play in heaven is rugby league. I reckon God loves it. A big part of what I'm trying to do now is incorporate my faith into my footy, a lot of people don't understand how that works but it works awesome for me. God has given me a gift so I'm trying to use it is through rugby league and glorify His name," he has said.

References

External links

Manly Sea Eagles profile
Wests Tigers profile
NRL profile
Samoa profile

1995 births
Living people
Glenora Bears players
Junior Kiwis players
Manly Warringah Sea Eagles players
New Zealand people of Italian descent
New Zealand sportspeople of Samoan descent
New Zealand rugby league players
Rugby league props
Rugby league second-rows
Samoa national rugby league team players
Wests Tigers players
Rugby league players from Auckland